Elections to Dover District Council in Kent, England were held on 5 May 2011. The whole council was up for election. The previous election for the District Council was held in May 2007.

Election result 
The Conservatives retained overall control, albeit with a reduced majority. Labour captured four seats from the Conservatives, who themselves took two from the Liberal Democrats, eliminating the latter from the council. Although Labour had recovered some seats, they did not restore their position as before the previous election in 2007. 

Seat gains/losses are in relation to the previous whole council election in 2007.

Ward results
Only Labour offered candidates in all wards (but not all seats); the Conservatives left the field clear for an independent to oppose Labour in Town and Pier (unsuccessfully). The Liberal Democrats stood in only five wards (ten in 2007), nowhere being particularly popular in terms of votes except in the ward where they lost their only two seats. Unusually, UKIP did not put forward any candidates. There were several independent or local interest candidates.

Successful candidates are in bold; defending incumbents are indicated by "*". Percentages are of the total number of votes cast (In multiple member wards, each voter may vote for each vacancy, i.e., in a three-member ward each voter has three votes).

References

2011
2011 English local elections
2010s in Kent